Tomáš Vaclík (born 29 March 1989) is a Czech professional footballer who plays as a goalkeeper for English EFL Championship club Huddersfield Town and the Czech Republic national team.

Vaclík participated in the 2011 UEFA European Under-21 Football Championship and was named in the team of the tournament. He made his senior debut for the Czech Republic in 2012 and was part of the side's squad at UEFA Euro 2016 and UEFA Euro 2020.

Club career

Czech leagues

Vaclík started out with FC Vítkovice in the Czech 2. Liga where he played for three seasons before transferring to Viktoria Žižkov. Žižkov won promotion to the Czech First League in Vaclík's first season with the club. In July 2011, Vaclík signed a three-year contract with De Graafschap but it was later announced that he had failed a medical in the Netherlands and would be returning to Prague.

Vaclík played for Žižkov during the first half of the 2011–12 Czech First League. In January 2012, with Žižkov bottom of the league with seven points from 16 matches, Vaclík transferred to Sparta Prague for a reported fee of 8.25 million CZK, signing a contract to keep him at the club until the summer of 2016.

Basel
On 22 May 2014 it was announced that Vaclík had signed for FC Basel of the Swiss Super League on a four-year contract with an option for another year. He joined the team for their 2014–15 season under head coach Paulo Sousa. After playing in four test games Vaclik played his domestic league debut for the club in the away game in the Stadion Brügglifeld on 19 July 2014 as Basel won 2–1 against Aarau. Basel entered the Champions League in the group stage. They reached the knockout phase on 9 December 2014, as they managed a 1–1 draw at Anfield against Liverpool. But they were knocked out of the competition by Porto in the round of 16. At the end of the 2014–15 season, Basel won the championship for the sixth time in a row. In the 2014–15 Swiss Cup Basel reached the final. However for the third time in a row they finished as runners-up. Basel played a total of 65 matches (36 Swiss League fixtures, 6 Swiss Cup, 8 Champions League and 15 test matches). Under manager Paulo Sousa Vaclík totaled 51 appearances, 33 in the League, 8 in the Champions League as well 10 in test games.

At the end of the 2015–16 Super League season, under new head coach Urs Fischer, Vaclík won the championship for the second time. Vaclík then extended his contract with the club, this was then dated up until the end of June 2021.

At the end of Basel's 2016–17 season, Vaclík won the championship with the club for the third time. For the club this was the eighth title in a row and their 20th championship title in total. They also won the 2016–17 Swiss Cup, defeating Sion 3–0 in the final, which meant they had won the double.

Basel's new head coach for their 2017–18 season was Raphaël Wicky. This season didn't work out that well for the team. After losing against Young Boys in the first match of the season, Basel were always behind in the league table. They ended the championship as runners-up. In the 2017–18 Swiss Cup Basel reached the semi-final, but here they suffered a defeat against the Young Boys as well. On 4 July 2018 Basel announced that Vaclic had signed for Sevilla FC. In his four seasons as their first goalkeeper, Vaclic played a total of 195 games for Basel. 132 of these games were in the Swiss Super League, four in the Swiss Cup, 33 in the UEFA competitions (Champions League and Europa League) and 26 were friendly games. He had won the championship three times and the Swiss Cup once.

Sevilla

On 9 July 2018, Vaclík signed with Sevilla FC in Spain's La Liga. After three years, Vaclík confirmed on his Facebook page that he would leave Sevilla after the end of the season.

Olympiacos
On 13 July 2021, Vaclík signed a two-year contract with Olympiacos F.C. of the Super League Greece. He was signed to replace José Sá, who moved to Wolverhampton Wanderers.

Huddersfield Town
On 31 January 2023, Vaclík signed a contract with EFL Championship side Huddersfield Town until the end of the 2022–23 season.

International career

Vaclík represented Czech Republic at youth level between 2005 and 2011, progressing from the under-16 team up to the under-21 team. Vaclík was involved in the national team for the first time in 2011, selected as a third goalkeeper for the squad's matches against Spain and Luxembourg, although he did not play. He made his senior debut for Czech Republic on 14 November 2012 in a 3–0 friendly victory against Slovakia.

Career statistics

Club

International

Honours
Sparta Prague
 Czech First League: 2013–14

Basel
 Swiss Super League: 2014–15, 2015–16, 2016–17
 Swiss Cup: 2016–17, runner up: 2014–15

Sevilla
 UEFA Europa League: 2019–20
 UEFA Super Cup runner-up: 2020 

Olympiacos
Super League Greece: 2021–22

Czech Republic U21
UEFA European Under-21 Championship bronze: 2011

Czech Republic
China Cup bronze: 2018

Individual
UEFA European Under-21 Championship: Team of the Tournament 2011
Swiss Super League Team of the Year: 2014–15 2015–16,  2016–17, 2017–18
La Liga Player of the Month: November 2018
 Czech Footballer of the Year: 2018
 Golden Ball (Czech Republic): 2019
Super League Greece Player of the Month: January 2022

References

External links
 Profile season 2015/16 on the Swiss Football League homepage
 
 

1989 births
Living people
Sportspeople from Ostrava
Czech footballers
Czech Republic youth international footballers
Czech Republic under-21 international footballers
Czech Republic international footballers
Association football goalkeepers
MFK Vítkovice players
FK Viktoria Žižkov players
AC Sparta Prague players
FC Basel players
Sevilla FC players
Czech First League players
Swiss Super League players
La Liga players
UEFA Euro 2016 players
UEFA Euro 2020 players
Czech expatriate footballers
Expatriate footballers in Switzerland
Expatriate footballers in Spain
Czech expatriate sportspeople in Switzerland
Czech expatriate sportspeople in Spain
UEFA Europa League winning players
Olympiacos F.C. players
Expatriate footballers in Greece
Czech National Football League players
Czech expatriate sportspeople in Greece
Huddersfield Town A.F.C. players
Czech expatriate sportspeople in England
Expatriate footballers in England